Mabel Cahill won the singles tennis title by defeating challenger Elisabeth Moore, a 17-year old player from the Hohokus Valley Tennis Club, 5–7, 6–3, 6–4, 4–6, 6–2 in the Challenge Round of the 1892 U.S. Women's National Singles Championship. Moore had won the right to challenge Cahill by defeating Helen Day Harris 5–7, 6–1, 6–1 in the final of the All Comers' competition. The event was played on outdoor grass courts and held at the Philadelphia Cricket Club in Chestnut Hill, Philadelphia from June 21 through June 25, 1892.

Draw

Challenge round

All Comers' finals

References

1892
1892 in American women's sports
June 1892 sports events
Women's Singles
1892 in women's tennis
Women's sports in Pennsylvania
Chestnut Hill, Philadelphia
1892 in Pennsylvania